Modern Family is an American situation comedy. It has been nominated for a variety of different awards, including eight Television Critic Awards (3 wins), ten Directors Guild of America Awards (2 wins), twelve Golden Globe Awards (1 win), eighteen Writers Guild of America Awards (6 wins), twenty-five Screen Actors Guild Awards (5 wins), and eighty Primetime Emmy Awards (22 wins). It has also received four consecutive awards from the American Film Institute, awarding the best of television, one for each of its first four seasons (2010–2013).

Emmy Awards

Primetime Emmy Awards

Cast nominations by season

Creative Arts Emmy Awards

Art Directors Guild Awards

Directors Guild Awards

GLAAD Media Awards

Golden Globe Awards

Imagen Foundation Awards

NAACP Image Awards

Nickelodeon Kids' Choice Awards

Peabody Awards

People's Choice Awards

Producers Guild of America Awards

Satellite Awards

Screen Actors Guild Awards

Teen Choice Awards

Television Critics Awards

Writers Guild of America Awards

Young Artist Award

References

Modern Family
Awards